Kvamsøya or Kvamsøy may refer to the following:

Kvamsøya, Vestland, an island in Alver municipality in Vestland county, Norway
Kvamsøy, Kvam, an island in Kvam municipality in Vestland county, Norway
Kvamsøya, Møre og Romsdal, an island in Sande municipality in Møre og Romsdal county, Norway
Kvamsøy, Sogndal, an island in Sogndal municipality in Vestland county, Norway
Kvamsøy Church, a historic parish church in Sogndal municipality in Vestland county, Norway

See also
Kvamsøyna, an island in Masfjorden municipality in Vestland county, Norway